Bozcaada is a Turkish place name and it may refer to
Bozcaada, Çanakkale a district of Çanakkale Province
Tenedos, historical name of the Aegean island Bozcaada